Jack Prince may refer to:
 Jack Prince (footballer)
 Jack Prince (singer)